Cephalanthus salicifolius is a species of flowering plant in the family Rubiaceae. Common names include Mexican buttonbush, mimbre, botoncillo, and Jazmin blanco.  Its native range extends from the banks of the southernmost stretch of the Rio Grande in Cameron and Hidalgo Counties of Texas through much of Mexico from Coahuila to Oaxaca; a disjunct population exists in Honduras.

Like other species in its genus, Mexican buttonbush grows in the wet soils of riparian zones, swamps, and pond margins.
The white flowers are produced from March to July; the fruit is a collection of brown nutlets.

References

External links
Texas A&M University, Texas Native Plants Database, Mexican buttonbush
Gardening Europe, Cephalanthus salicifolius
Field Museum in Chicago, photo of herbarium specimen of Cephalanthus salicifolius collected in Honduras

salicifolius
Plants described in 1809
Flora of Honduras
Flora of Mexico
Flora of Texas
Flora of the Rio Grande valleys
Taxa named by Aimé Bonpland
Taxa named by Alexander von Humboldt